Deeg is a historical district in the state of Rajasthan, India.

In Hindu mythology, Deeg was situated along the parikrama path of Krishna, which started at Goverdhan,  from Deeg. Some people identify it as the ancient town of "Dirgha" or "Dirghapur" mentioned in the epic Skanda Purana. Deeg was the first capital of the Sinsinwar Hindu Jat state of Bharatpur, when Maharaja Badan Singh was proclaimed its ruler in 1722. In 1730, Maharaja Suraj Mal built the strong fortress of Deeg. After Suraj Mal moved the capital to Bharatpur, Deeg became the second capital of the rulers of Bharatpur princely state. It is known for its number of forts, palaces, gardens and fountains.

Deeg in films
Scenes of periodic love story Noorjehan(1967) were shoot in Deeg Palace

Indian classical love story "Mughal-e-Azam" has some shooting in Deeg Palace.

Some scenes of Siddhartha (1972) Indo-American drama mystery film based on the 1922 novel of the same name by Hermann Hesse, shoot in deeg palace and Keoladeo National Park of Bharatpur

Geography

History
After acquiring the throne, Maharaja Badan Singh chose Deeg as the place for his stronghold and capital. Hence, he initiated the construction of the Deeg Palace here. Being the capital of the Jat rulers and located at a distance of just about 32 km from Bharatpur, his palace served as a summer mansion for the royal family. He became the founder of Jat House in Bharatpur and under his reign, the place gained immense prosperity and urbanisation. In fact, Surajmal, son of Badan Singh is often hailed as the hero of the Jat dynasty. Owing to its great location, architectural beauty and grandeur, the palace caught the attention of many dynasties and almost constantly under the threat from Mughals. Hence, in order to protect the stunning Deeg Palace against the attack from invader, Maharaja Suraj Mal ordered the construction of a mighty fortress around the palace.

During 1804, both the Battle of Deeg and the Siege of Deeg brought the British East India Company into conflict with Bharatpur's Jat rulers and their Maratha allies for control of the area.

Architecture 
The palace complex together with its water gardens was a summer retreat for the maharajas of Bharatpur. The layout comprises several palaces called bhawans, interwoven within series of charbaghs and water gardens. The major Bhawans are Gopal Bhawan, Divan I Khas or the Kishan Bhawan, Wrestling palace or Nand Bhawan, Keshav Bhawan, Hardev Bhawan, Suraj Bhawan and symmetrically arranged twin pavilions of Sawan & Bhadon.

"Deeg and Delhi were at that time the center of equal beauty and trade, Deeg was the first class among the protected places of fortifications of India."

Demographics
 India census, Deeg had a population of 44,999. Males constitute 54% of the population and females 46%. Deeg has an average literacy rate of 75.61%, higher than the national average of 74.04%: male literacy is 85.73% and, female literacy is 64.23%. In Deeg, 17% of the population is under 6 years of age.

Sex ratio of Deeg is 886

Attractions & Festivals 
 Deeg Palace with its 900 fountains, which operate twice a year during Braj Holi festival in February/ March and the Avamasaya festival in September. There is a Jawahar exhibition fair is held every year  around September. The Deeg Palace museum is closed on Fridays.
 Deeg fort is known for its security and force. The Deeg fort is designed as a square and stands on a slightly elevated ground. Its walls are made of rubble and mud and are strengthened with twelve imposing towers, which are the most impressive features of the Deeg fort. The largest tower is known as Lakha-Burj that is located in the North West corner. These towers were fixed with cannons to hunt down any advancing enemy. The entire Deeg fort is surrounded by a shallow wide moat to which access is possible through a bridge on the northern side linked with the only gate. The gateway to the fort is confined with anti elephant strikes. A partially ruined palace or haveli is the principal building of Deeg fort. Some parts of the palace have been re-constructed in the 20th century almost like the original. The palace has a court covered by compartments. The use of red sandstones and pointed arch of the palace is remarkable. The other significant structures of the fort include certain underground chambers, the tomb of Muhammad Shafi, a Mughal Mir-bakshi.

References 

Cities and towns in Bharatpur district
History of Bharatpur, Rajasthan